Theodore Lee Goulait (August 12, 1889 – July 15, 1936) was an American pitcher in Major League Baseball who played for the New York Giants in September 1912, among other teams.

Goulait was born on August 12, 1889, in St. Clair, Michigan, and died in his hometown on July 15, 1936, aged 46.

References

External links

1889 births
1936 deaths
Major League Baseball pitchers
New York Giants (NL) players
Baseball players from Michigan
Marion Diggers players
Springfield Reapers players
Toronto Maple Leafs (International League) players
Wilkes-Barre Barons (baseball) players
Memphis Chickasaws players
People from St. Clair, Michigan
Sportspeople from Metro Detroit